Wareham is a town in Plymouth County, Massachusetts, United States. As of the 2020 census, the town had a population of 23,303.

History 
Wareham was first settled in 1678 by Europeans as part of the towns of Plymouth and Rochester. It was officially incorporated in 1739 and named after the town of Wareham in England. Because of its geography, Wareham's early industry revolved around shipbuilding and the related industries.  It also served as a resort town, with many smaller resorts scattered around the town, especially in Onset.  Like Sandwich, its waterways, especially Buttermilk Bay, were considered as possible pathways for the Cape Cod Canal.  Although the canal proper goes through Bourne and Sandwich, the southern approach to Buzzards Bay passes just south of the peninsulas that make up the topography of the town.

Wareham is home of the Tremont Nail Factory, the oldest nail manufacturer in the United States.  The factory was established in 1819.

For years the town was known by its slogan "Gateway to Cape Cod," but in January 2020 adopted a new slogan: "It's Better Before the Bridges." The intent was to draw attention to the appeal of Wareham as a tourist destination itself, rather than as a conduit to somewhere else.

Geography
The total area is 22.64% water. Wareham is bordered by Marion to the southwest, Buzzards Bay to the southeast, Rochester to the west, Middleborough to the northwest, Carver and Plymouth to the north, and Bourne to the east. The town's localities are numerous, the most important being East Wareham, Onset, Point Independence, Wareham Center, and West Wareham.

Wareham is the innermost town on the north shore of Buzzards Bay.  The Weweantic River empties in the southwest corner of town, with the Sippican River and other brooks emptying into it.  The Wareham River, which is formed at the confluence of the Wankinco and Agawam rivers, flows into the harbor east of the Weweantic, and has brooks and the Mill Pond River as tributaries.  To the east lie Onset Bay and Buttermilk Bay, both of which empty into the head of the bay, at the right-of-way of the Cape Cod Canal.  Between these rivers and bays lie several points and necks, including Cromesett Point, Swift's Neck, Long Beach Point, Indian Neck, Stony Point, Cedar Island Point, Codman's Point, Sias Point and Whittemore's Point. The southern boundary of Myles Standish State Forest is concurrent with the town line between Wareham and Plymouth.

The town of Wareham encompasses a number of neighborhoods and named places, including Onset, Wareham Center, West Wareham, East Wareham, and Weweantic.

There are a number of ponds and lakes in Wareham, including Blackmore Pond, Horseshoe Pond, and Mill Pond.

Demographics

As of the census of 2000, there were 20,335 people, 8,200 households, and 5,338 families residing in the town. The racial makeup of the town as of July 2019 was 85.7% White, 2.7% African American, Asian 0.6%, 5.1% from two or more races, 3.6% Hispanic or Latino and 0.6% American Indian.

There were 8,200 households, out of which 29.5% had children under the age of 18 living with them, 46.4% were married couples living together, 14.2% had a female householder with no husband present, and 34.9% were non-families. 29.2% of all households were made up of individuals, and 12.6% had someone living alone who was 65 years of age or older.  The average household size was 2.44 and the average family size was 3.02.

In the town, the population was spread out, with 24.5% under the age of 18, 6.3% from 18 to 24, 28.5% from 25 to 44, 24.5% from 45 to 64, and 16.2% who were 65 years of age or older.  The median age was 39 years. For every 100 females, there were 91.5 males.  For every 100 females age 18 and over, there were 86.9 males.

The median income for a household in the town was $40,422, and the median income for a family was $45,750. Males had a median income of $37,601 versus $28,306 for females. The per capita income for the town was $21,312.  10.7% of the population and 8.1% of families were below the poverty line. Of those 16.6% under the age of 18 and 13.5% of those 65 and older were living below the poverty line.

Economy
Today, Wareham is mostly residential, although it still has a strong summer tourism industry. It has retail centers along Routes 6 and 28, including Wareham Crossing, opened in 2007.

Historically, the cranberry industry has dominated Wareham's economy, as evidenced by the fact that the main local road is known as Cranberry Highway (Route 28) and one of the world's largest cranberry growers, the A.D. Makepeace Company (a founder of the Ocean Spray growers' cooperative), is headquartered in Wareham. The University of Massachusetts Cranberry Research Station is also located in Wareham, as is the U.S. Department of Agriculture's Cranberry Marketing Committee.

Government

Wareham is represented in the Massachusetts House of Representatives as a part of the Second Plymouth district, which also includes Carver and part of Middleboro.  The town is represented in the Massachusetts Senate as a part of the First Plymouth and Bristol district, which also includes Berkley, Bridgewater, Carver, Dighton, Marion, Middleborough, Raynham and Taunton.  The town is patrolled by the Seventh (Bourne) Barracks of Troop D of the Massachusetts State Police.

On the national level, Wareham is part of Massachusetts's 9th congressional district and is currently represented by William R. Keating.  Its senators are currently Elizabeth Warren and Ed Markey.

Wareham is governed by the open town meeting form of government, which is led by a town administrator and a board of selectmen.

There is a central police station located along Route 28.  The Wareham Fire District (career/on-call) has stations located in Wareham Center (Station No. 1, Manned Career/on-call), East Wareham (Station No. 4, Unmanned On-call), West Wareham (Station No. 2, Unmanned On-call) and in White Island, near Glen Charlie Pond (Station No. 3, Unmanned On-call) in the northeast corner of town. The Onset Fire District (paid/on-call) has fire stations located in Onset Village and off Route 28/Cranberry Highway near the intersection of Main Avenue. Wareham EMS has a station located on Sandwich Road (Route 6).

There are four post offices for the town's four ZIP Codes, located in East Wareham (02538), West Wareham (02576), Wareham Center (02571) and a branch office in Onset (02558). The southeast portion of Wareham is also covered by 02532 of Buzzards Bay.  The town's public library, located across the street from the town hall, is part of the SAILS Library Network.

Education

Public schools
Wareham has a public school system. There is one elementary schoolJohn W. Decas.  Minot Forest Elementarywas closed in 2018 and absorbed into the middle school until a new building is erected for Minot.; Wareham Middle School; and Wareham High School. The East Wareham Partnership houses the former West Wareham Academy and the Cooperative Junior-Senior High School.

Wareham High competes in the South Coast Conference for athletics.  Its nickname is the Vikings, and its colors are Blue, White, and Gold.  Wareham competes with Bourne High School in an annual Thanksgiving Day football game.

The town also sends students to Upper Cape Cod Regional Technical High School

High school students may also choose to attend Upper Cape Cod Regional Technical School in Bourne.

Private schools
There are no private schools in the town, with the nearest being Tabor Academy in Marion. The nearest Catholic high school is Bishop Stang High School in Dartmouth.

Infrastructure

Major highways
The town has always been a vital transportation point, as the Bay Colony Railroad crosses through the town on its way to Cape Cod.  There is a rail station in the town center just behind Main St. Next to the pond.  Interstates 495 and 195 both terminate in the western part of town, with I-495's highway route continuing on as Massachusetts Route 25, which passes through town and around Buttermilk Bay before ending at the Bourne Bridge.  Additionally, U.S. Route 6 and Massachusetts Route 28 meet in East Wareham and continue on towards Cape Cod.  Route 58's southern terminus is at Route 28 in Rochester near the Wareham town line.

Rail
There is currently no commuter rail service to Wareham, as the MBTA's Middleborough/Lakeville Line was only restored to Middleborough/Lakeville in 1997. The seasonal CapeFLYER service began stopping at Wareham Village station in June 2014. Based on the success of the CapeFLYER, commuter service to Wareham and Buzzards Bay is under consideration.

The nearest inter-city (Amtrak) passenger rail stations are Route 128, Providence, and Boston's South Station. The nearest MBTA Commuter Rail station is Middleborough/Lakeville.

Freight rail service is provided by the Massachusetts Coastal Railroad.

Bus
Bonanza Bus Lines stops at the Mill Pond Diner daily. A local bus service, the OWL (Onset Wareham Link), operated by the Greater Attleboro Taunton Regional Transit Authority (GATRA), provides bus service around Wareham. The buses also have run to a Tedeschi store in Bourne for connection to Bonanza Buses and to the MBTA's Middleborough/Lakeville Station. Service to these locations is often changed.

Air
The nearest national and international flights can be reached at Logan International Airport in Boston or T. F. Green Airport in Rhode Island. Barnstable Municipal Airport is also a short trip away, although it only allows for national service.

Health Care

Tobey Hospital was funded by a bequest from the estate of Alice Tobey Jones. The hospital was opened in 1940 and includes a surgical wing and intensive care unit. In 2019, the town approved an expansion of the hospital, which resulted in the demolition of the historic Tobey Homestead.

Sports

Wareham is home to the Wareham Gatemen, an amateur collegiate summer baseball team in the Cape Cod Baseball League. The team plays its home games at Clem Spillane Field, and has featured dozens of players who went on to careers in Major League Baseball, such as Mo Vaughn, Lance Berkman, and Kyle Schwarber.

Wareham has many town youth sports as well, including Wareham Little League, Wareham JBA, Gateway Babe Ruth, Pop Warner Wareham Tigers, Wareham Girls Softball (WGSA), and more.

Points of interest
 Tremont Nail Factory District, a historic nail factory located at 21 Elm Street, which operated from 1819 to 2006 by the Tremont Nail Company
 Water Wizz, water park in the area. It was a spot of filming for the 2010 film Grown Ups and the 2013 film The Way, Way Back.
The Glen Cove Hotel in Onset, MA.  A historic Victorian building built in the 1800s.  It's also the highest point in Onset.
Onset beach adjoins the concrete pier.  It is a well protected beach in a broad cove.

Notable people

 Outram Bangs (1863–1932), zoologist
 Benjamin Briggs (1835–), Captain of the merchant ship Mary Celeste
 Joe Campinha (1920–2001), Negro league baseball player with the Baltimore Elite Giants
 Stephen Cooper (born 1979), NFL Football player for the San Diego Chargers
 Geena Davis (born 1956), Academy Award and Golden Globe-winning actress
 Paul Fearing (1762–1822), a delegate to the U.S. House of Representatives from the Territory Northwest of the River Ohio
 Greg F. Gifune (born 1963), Novelist, Editor
 John Kendrick (1740–1794), sea captain and explorer of the Pacific Northwest
 Eugene T. Maleska (1916–1993), New York Times crossword puzzle editor, had a home in town
 Donald W. Nicholson (1888–1968), congressman
 Joshua Onujiogu (born 1998), NFL linebacker
 Pebbles (Susan L. Samedo, born 1964), Boston radio personality
 Skipp Sudduth (born 1956), actor
 Samuel T. Wellman (1847–1919), steel industry pioneer, industrialist, and prolific inventor
 Brandon Westgate (born 1989), professional skateboarder

References

External links

 Town of Wareham official website

 
Populated coastal places in Massachusetts
Towns in Massachusetts
Towns in Plymouth County, Massachusetts